Johann Binder (22 August 1909 – ?) was an Austrian rower. He finished fifth in men's coxless four at the 1936 Summer Olympics in Berlin.

References

1909 births
Year of death missing
Austrian male rowers
Olympic rowers of Austria
Rowers at the 1936 Summer Olympics
European Rowing Championships medalists